von Einem is a surname. Notable people with the surname include:

Bevan Spencer von Einem (born 1945), Australian murderer
Gottfried von Einem (1918–1996), Austrian composer
Karl von Einem (1853–1934), German general
Samuel Von Einem (born 1995), Australian table tennis player